The 2022 Women's T20I Pacific Cup was a women's Twenty20 International (WT20I) cricket tournament that took place in Port Vila, Vanuatu, from 3 to 6 October 2022. The participants were the women's national sides of Vanuatu, Fiji, Papua New Guinea and Samoa. Papua New Guinea had entered the event after recently competing in the 2022 ICC Women's T20 World Cup Qualifier in Abu Dhabi, but the other three teams had not played an international fixture since the Pacific Games cricket tournament in July 2019.

Papua New Guinea and Vanuatu each won both of their matches on the opening day of the tournament. Papua New Guinea again won twice on the second day of the event, while Samoa gained revenge for their opening day loss to the hosts to also pick up two wins on the day. A 10-wicket win against Samoa on the final day saw Papua New Guinea secure top spot in the table, before the last pair of games were both abandoned due to rain.

Squads

Points Table

Fixtures

References

External links
 Series home at ESPN Cricinfo

2023 in women's cricket
Associate international cricket competitions in 2022–23
Pacific Cup